Scotopteryx vittistrigata is a species of moth of the family Geometridae.

Description
Head, thorax, and abdomen are pale ochreous varied with brown. Forewings are pale ochreous, crossed by numerous oblique brown lines. Hindwing with the lines most distinct on the inner margin, except the outer line and terminal area, which are distinct throughout.

Distribution
This species can be found in Brazil.

References

 
 Animal Diversity

Scotopteryx
Moths described in 1910